Joshua James Payne (born 25 November 1990) is an English footballer who plays as a midfielder for Hayes & Yeading United. He has previously played for West Ham United, Cheltenham Town, Colchester United, Wycombe Wanderers, Doncaster Rovers, Oxford United, Aldershot Town, Woking, Eastleigh, Crawley Town, Ebbsfleet United and Barnet.

Early life
Payne was born and grew up in Basingstoke, where he attended Brighton Hill Community College.

Club career
Payne began his career with Portsmouth and Southampton before moving to West Ham United. He was named as 2008–09 captain of the West Ham Under-18 team, but joined Cheltenham Town on an initial one-month loan on 24 September 2008. He made his debut for Cheltenham against Stockport County on 27 September 2008, scoring a goal in the 66th minute. Payne's loan with Cheltenham Town lasted three months before he returned to West Ham on 22 December 2008.
Payne made his West Ham and Premier League debut on 21 March 2009 in a 1–1 away draw against Blackburn Rovers coming on as a 90th-minute substitute for Diego Tristán.

On 22 October 2009 Payne signed for Colchester United on a one-month loan. Payne made his debut for Colchester on 24 October 2009 in a 2–1 home victory against Walsall and was fouled for a penalty, which resulted in Colchester's second and winning goal. Payne returned to West Ham on 20 November, having played only three games for Colchester, as manager Aidy Boothroyd decided not to extend his loan.

On 22 January 2010 Wycombe Wanderers confirmed they had signed Payne on an initial one-month loan. Payne made his debut for Wycombe on 23 January, scoring in a 1–1 away draw against Southend United.

He returned to West Ham on 25 February 2010. In March 2010 it was announced that Payne's contract with West Ham would not be renewed beyond the end of the 2009–10 season.

On 28 July 2010 Payne signed for Doncaster Rovers on an initial six-months contract after a successful trial period at the club. He made his Rovers debut in the League Cup tie against Accrington Stanley on 10 August 2010, scoring his first and Doncaster's only goal in a 2–1 defeat.

On 31 August 2010 Payne joined Oxford United on a one-month loan deal, which was then extended for another three months. Payne subsequently signed a pre-contract agreement with Oxford, making the move permanent. He scored his first goal for Oxford from a free kick in a 3–1 home victory against Northampton on 23 October 2010.

In January 2012 it was confirmed that Payne would be joining Aldershot Town on loan, initially for a month but later extended to the end of the season. On 5 March, the move was made permanent on a free transfer.

On 24 June 2013, shortly after his release from prison, Payne signed for Woking. Payne played 95 league and cup games for Woking. He left the Conference Premier side at the end of the 2014–15 season to join Eastleigh. After a successful debut season with Eastleigh, Payne decided to reject a new one-year deal to venture into The Football League.

On 26 May 2016, Payne joined Crawley Town on a two-year deal. On 6 August 2016, Payne made his Crawley debut in a 1–0 victory against Wycombe Wanderers, playing the full 90 minutes. On 3 October 2019, Payne joined National League club Ebbsfleet United on loan until January 2020. In January 2020, his loan was extended until the end of the season. His contract with Crawley Town was not extended at the end of the 2019–20 season.

Following his release from Crawley, Payne signed a two-year contract with former club Ebbsfleet United in July 2020. He signed for Barnet in July 2021. Payne left the Bees by mutual consent in January 2022. On 1 March 2022, Payne joined Southern League Premier Division South leaders Hayes & Yeading United.

Personal life
In December 2012 Payne was sent to prison for twelve months following a conviction for actual bodily harm and common assault following an incident in Guildford town centre in May 2012; upon conviction Aldershot terminated Payne's contract.

Career statistics

References

External links

Cheltenham profile

1990 births
Sportspeople from Basingstoke
Footballers from Hampshire
Living people
Association football midfielders
English footballers
West Ham United F.C. players
Cheltenham Town F.C. players
Colchester United F.C. players
Wycombe Wanderers F.C. players
Premier League players
English Football League players
Doncaster Rovers F.C. players
Oxford United F.C. players
Aldershot Town F.C. players
Woking F.C. players
Eastleigh F.C. players
Crawley Town F.C. players
Ebbsfleet United F.C. players
Barnet F.C. players
Hayes & Yeading United F.C. players
National League (English football) players
English people convicted of assault
England semi-pro international footballers